Obada Al-Kasbeh (born 30 July 1994) is a Jordanian boxer. He competed in the men's light welterweight competition at the 2016 Summer Olympics.

References

1994 births
Living people
Place of birth missing (living people)
Jordanian male boxers
Boxers at the 2016 Summer Olympics
Olympic boxers of Jordan
Boxers at the 2014 Asian Games
Boxers at the 2018 Asian Games
Asian Games bronze medalists for Jordan
Asian Games medalists in boxing
Medalists at the 2014 Asian Games
Light-welterweight boxers
Boxers at the 2020 Summer Olympics
21st-century Jordanian people